Vasco Maria Nunes Barata de Sousa Uva (born 15 December 1982 in Lisbon) is a former Portuguese rugby union player. He played as a number eight.

He took his law degree at the Catholic University of Portugal, in Lisbon, and he works as a lawyer.

Club career
In Portugal he played for Grupo Desportivo Direito. He played briefly for Montpellier Hérault RC in the top division of French rugby, the Top 14 with his brother Gonçalo Uva, which he joined in January 2008. He soon moved back to Direito, where he was the captain, until finishing his career at 2017/18. He also played for Lusitanos XV at international level.

International career
He was the captain of the Portugal national team in three of the four games at the 2007 Rugby World Cup finals. He was voted as Man of the Match in the 56-10 loss to Scotland. He commanded his team extremely well against New Zealand's All Blacks, but he fractured his hand against Italy and missed the last game of the RWC with Romania.

He was replaced as the capitan of the "Lobos" by João Correia before the match played with Russia, at 1 March 2008, which resulted in a 26-41 loss.

After the RWC he co-wrote Hoje é por Portugal (2007) (Today is For Portugal), a title taken from his quote before the first game against Scotland, a book that relates everything that this amateur team, and himself as the captain, lived before the qualifications and during this major sportive and professional event of their lives.

He had 101 caps for the Portugal National Team, from 2003 to 2016, with 13 tries scored, 65 points in aggregate. He is one of the most capped players for Portugal, and is also the first men's player from outside the Rugby Championship or Six Nations countries to reach the 100-cap mark.

References

External links
Vasco Uva Statistics

1982 births
Living people
Portuguese rugby union players
Portugal international rugby union players
Rugby union number eights
Grupo Desportivo Direito players
Montpellier Hérault Rugby players
Catholic University of Portugal alumni
Rugby union players from Lisbon